Team Lazarus is an Italian auto racing team, based in Padova, which is currently competing in the International GT Open and Blancpain GT Endurance Series formerly starting in GP2 Series and Auto GP.

Background

Team Lazarus were founded in 2009 by Tancredi Pagiaro, who also founded the GP Racing team in 1997.

The team took part in three rounds of the 2009 Euroseries 3000 season, debuting at the season-opener in Portimão with GP2 Series drivers Michael Herck and Diego Nunes, who were racing in order to learn the circuit ahead of the GP2 Series visit there later in the year. The team scored eleven points over the course of the weekend with Nunes and Herck finishing fourth and fifth respectively in the Saturday feature race.

At the next round in Magny-Cours, the team were down to a single car entry with Italian Formula Three graduate Michael Dalle Stelle taking over the driving duties. He remained with the team for the following round at Zolder, but failed to start either race during the event. The team then missed the final three events of the season in Valencia, Vallelunga and Monza. They finished the season in seventh place in the Teams' standings with twelve points.

In 2010, Team Lazarus have entered the new Auto GP series with a single car for Italian Fabio Onidi. The new partnership delivered a podium finish in the opening race of the season at Brno, with Onidi finishing third behind Edoardo Piscopo and race winner Luca Filippi.

In February 2012, it was announced that Lazarus would be joining the GP2 Series under the name "Venezuela GP Lazarus", replacing Super Nova Racing.

In 2017 Team Lazarus participated in two Championships: the Blancpain GT Series, with an orange Lamborghini Huracán with GT3 configuration, and a black Huracán with a layout for the Lamborghini Super Trofeo Asia Championship.

In 2018 Team Lazarus is starting in the Blancpain GT Endurance Series as well as in the International GT Open Championship.

Drivers for Team Lazarus include Fabrizio Crestani (Italy), Miguel Ramos (Portugal).

Results

GP2 Series

† Lazarus competed under the name Venezuela GP Lazarus from 2012 to 2014.

In detail

GP2 Series 
(key) (Races in bold indicate pole position) (Races in italics indicate fastest lap)

References

External links
  

Italian auto racing teams
Auto racing teams established in 2009
2009 establishments in Italy
GP2 Series teams
Auto GP teams
International GT Open teams
Blancpain Endurance Series teams